The 1990 NCAA Division III football season, part of the college football season organized by the NCAA at the Division III level in the United States, began in August 1990, and concluded with the NCAA Division III Football Championship, also known as the Stagg Bowl, in December 1990 at Hawkins Stadium in Bradenton, Florida. The Allegheny Gators won their first Division III championship by defeating the Lycoming Warriors, 21−14, in overtime.

Conference and program changes

Conference standings

Conference champions

Postseason
The 1990 NCAA Division III Football Championship playoffs were the 18th annual single-elimination tournament to determine the national champion of men's NCAA Division III college football. The championship Stagg Bowl game was held at Hawkins Stadium in Bradenton, Florida for the first time. Like the previous five tournaments, this year's bracket featured sixteen teams.

Playoff bracket

See also
1990 NCAA Division I-A football season
1990 NCAA Division I-AA football season
1990 NCAA Division II football season

References